Manton may refer to:

Places 
Australia
Manton, New South Wales
Manton, Northern Territory

Burma
Manton Township in North Shan State

United Kingdom
Manton, Lincolnshire
Manton, Nottinghamshire
Manton, Rutland
Manton, Wiltshire

United States
Manton, California
Manton, Kentucky
Manton, Michigan
Manton, Providence, Rhode Island

Other
 Manton (name)
Baron Manton, a title in the peerage of the United Kingdom
Joseph Watson, 1st Baron Manton (1873-1922), industrialist and philanthropist
George Miles Watson, 2nd Baron Manton (1899-1968), racehorse breeder
Rupert Watson, 3rd Baron Manton (1924-2003)
 The Mad Miss Manton is an American film that premiered in the year 1938

See also
 Normanton (disambiguation)
 Menton